A fid is a conical tool traditionally made of wood or bone. It is used to work with rope and canvas in marlinespike seamanship. A fid differs from a marlinspike in material and purposes. A marlinspike is used in working with wire rope, natural and synthetic lines, may be used to open shackles, and is made of metal. A fid is used to hold open knots and holes in canvas, and to separate the "lays" (or strands) of synthetic or natural rope for splicing.  A variation of the fid, the gripfid, is used for ply-split braiding. The gripfid has a jamming cleat to pull a cord back through the cord split by the fid's point.

Modern fids are typically made of aluminum, steel, or plastic.  In addition to holding rope open to assist the creation of a rope splice, modern push fids have markings for precise measurements in a variety of sizes of rope.  The length of these fids is typically 21 or 22 times the diameter of rope to be spliced.  A half-inch diameter rope would have any accompanying fid 10.5–11" in length with hash-marks denoting the long and short fid measurements. A short fid is  a fid length and a long fid is  the overall fid length.

Modern major rope manufacturers such as Yale Cordage, New England Ropes, and Samson Rope Technologies each have full sets of published splicing directions available on their websites.  Typically, all splice directions measurements use fid-length as the unit of measurement.

Below is a chart that shows exact measurements of full fid lengths, short fid lengths, and long fid lengths, using 21 times the diameter of the rope.

See also 

 Eye splice
 Rope splicing
 Marlinspike
 Top

References

External links

Animated splice & image of fid in use
Instructable for creating a fid for use with paracord

Ropework
Tools